Sgùrr nan Eag is a mountain  high in the Cuillin range on the Isle of Skye, Scotland. It is the southernmost Munro of the Cuillins and it lies between Coir' a' Ghrunnda to the west, Gars-bheinn to the east, and Garb-choire to the north.

Geography
Loch Brittle and the Scavaig River are to the west and east. Sgùrr Dubh an Da Beinn, a Munro Top is on the ridge to the north with Coir' a' Ghrunnda to the west and An Garbh-Coire to the east of this connecting ridge. On the ridge between Sgùrr nan Eag and Gars-bheinn is the shattered quartzite summit of Sgùrr a' Choire Bhig.

Sgùrr nan Eag is, by the standards of the Cuillin, not very impressive compared with the peaks to the north but it is a huge mountain with a long and level summit ridge.

Climbing
The mountain can be easily climbed from Glen Brittle up Coir' a' Grunnda, going south of Loch Coir' a' Grunnda to the Cuillin ridge and ascending the north ridge to the summit. The alternative of taking the south shoulder from the coastal path up  of scree is tedious, even though it is easy. From An Garbh-choire there is no easy way up the northeast flank but the north ridge and east ridge can be reached with scrambling. There is an easy and fine ridge walk to Gars-Bheinn.

References

Citations

Works cited

External links

360Routes.com - Virtual Tour over Sgùrr nan Eag.

Mountains and hills of the Isle of Skye
Mountains and hills of Highland (council area)
Munros